Marsilea villosa, the ihiihi (Hawaiian) or villous waterclover (English), is a species of fern that is endemic to the islands of Oahu, Molokai and Niihau in Hawaii. It is found exclusively in areas that experience periodic flooding and become ephemeral pools within low elevation dry forests and shrublands. Standing water allows the sporocarp to open and release spores. It also enables the resulting sperm to swim toward and fertilize female ova. For new plants to become established, the waters must subside. Sporocarps only form once the soil has dried to a certain level. Like other species in its genus, the leaves of M. villosa resemble those of a four-leaf clover.

Conservation
Fewer than 2,000 individual plants exist in four remaining populations. The plant was federally listed as an endangered species in 1992.

References

External links

villosa
Endemic flora of Hawaii
Native ferns of Hawaii